Valeri Valeryevich Safonov (born 13 May 1987) is a former Russian professional footballer.

Club career
He played two seasons in the Russian Football National League for FC Krasnodar and FC Zhemchuzhina-Sochi.

Honours
 Russian Cup winner with PFC CSKA Moscow: 2006 (played 2 games in the tournament).

External links
 
 

1987 births
People from Istrinsky District
Living people
Russian footballers
Association football defenders
PFC CSKA Moscow players
FC Krasnodar players
FC Zhemchuzhina Sochi players
PFC Spartak Nalchik players
FC Sokol Saratov players
Sportspeople from Moscow Oblast